Wishing Well is a BBC Books original novel written by Trevor Baxendale and based on the long running science fiction television series Doctor Who. It features the Tenth Doctor and Martha Jones. It was published on 26 December 2007 alongside Peacemaker and The Pirate Loop.

Audiobook
An abridged audiobook was released in July 2008. It is read by Debbie Chazen, who plays Foon Van Hoff in the episode "Voyage of the Damned".

See also
Whoniverse

References

External links

The Cloister Library - Wishing Well

2007 British novels
2007 science fiction novels
New Series Adventures
Tenth Doctor novels
Novels by Trevor Baxendale